Charles Melton may refer to:

 Charles Melton Wines, an Australian winery
 Charles Melton (actor) (born 1991), American actor and model